Ali Ghalioum (born 20 June 1987) is a Syrian footballer who plays for Al-Harjalah, which competes in the Syrian League the top division in Syria. His younger brother Bakr plays at Al-Wathba.

Honours

Club 
Al-Quwa Al-Jawiya
 AFC Cup: 2016

References

External links
 Career stats at goalzz.com
 Career stats at goal.com

1987 births
Living people
Syrian footballers
Syria international footballers
Syrian expatriate footballers
Expatriate footballers in Lebanon
Syrian expatriate sportspeople in Lebanon
Lebanese Premier League players
Shabab Al Sahel FC players
Sagesse SC footballers
Association football midfielders
AFC Cup winning players
Syrian Premier League players